"Tu" is a song written by Umberto Tozzi and Giancarlo Bigazzi and recorded by Tozzi in 1978. Along with "Ti amo" and "Gloria", it is his most successful and well-known song.

Charts

Year-End chart

Sales

References

1978 singles
Umberto Tozzi songs
Songs written by Umberto Tozzi
Songs written by Giancarlo Bigazzi
1978 songs
Compagnia Generale del Disco singles
CBS Records singles
Number-one singles in Switzerland